Lophosiosoma is a genus of flies in the family Tachinidae.

Species
 Lophosiosoma bicornis Mesnil, 1973

References

Tachinidae